China Coast Guard Academy is a higher education institution dedicated to training talents for China Coast Guard. Located in Ningbo, Zhejiang, China, the academy is known as the "cradle of border police" and is listed in the order of battle of the People's Armed Police (PAP) as a deputy corps leader grade unit.

History 
In 1982, the academy was founded as the Training Division for the Coastal Patrol of Zhejiang Provincial Contingent of the Chinese People's Armed Police under the Ministry of Public Security, and organised as a regiment commander level unit in the order of fight of the PAP. 

In September 1983, the State Council approved the foundation of the Surface Vessel School of the People's Armed Police on the basis of the training division and under the direct supervision of the PAP headquarter. The first batch of students were enrolled in September 1985.

In August 1993, the supervising agency changed from the PAP headquarter to the Ministry of Public Security. The school was thus organised as a unit in the fight of order of the Border Defence Force of the Ministry of Public Security. In September 1997, the school began recruiting students as a post-secondary specialised school rather than as secondary specialised school in the past. In March 1999, the school formally upgraded with the approval from the Ministry of Education and became the Higher Vocational School of Coastal Police. In December 2009, with the approval from the Ministry of Education, the school was renamed as China Maritime Police Academy and began offering degree education as the only higher education institution in China to offer training for maritime law enforcement.  

In August 2012, the academy became co-funded by the Ministry of Public Security, the People's Government of Zhejiang Province, the Municipal People's Government of Ningbo City. With the separation of the Coast Guard from the Border Defence Force, the academy came under PAP as part of China Coast Guard since July 2018.

Education 
In 2010, the first four undergraduate programmes the academy offered included navigational technology, marine engineering, electronic science and technology, electrical information engineering. As an academy for coast guard training, academy contextualised its education for maritime law enforcement, with additional training in maritime rescue, damage control, etc.

References 

Universities and colleges in Zhejiang
1982 establishments in China
China Coast Guard
People's Armed Police
Military academies of China